The 1998 Malta Grand Prix was a professional invitational snooker tournament which took place at the New Dolmen Hotel in Buġibba, Malta in December 1998.

Stephen Hendry won the tournament, defeating Ken Doherty 7–6 in the final. The highest break, a 104, was compiled by Doherty in his quarter-final match against Jimmy White.

Prize fund
The breakdown of prize money for this year is shown below:
Winner   £6,000
Runner-up £3,000
Highest break  £1,000
Total   £20,000

Main draw

Century breaks
104, 100  Ken Doherty

References

Malta Grand Prix
1998 in snooker
1998 in Maltese sport
St. Paul's Bay